Pa-ye Takht-e Golzar (also Romanized as 'Pā-ye Takht-e Golzār; also known as Takht-e Golzār) is a village in Qilab Rural District, Alvar-e Garmsiri District, Andimeshk County, Khuzestan Province, Iran. At the 2006 census, its population was 143, in 24 families.

References 

Populated places in Andimeshk County